Torture in Venezuela has been a consistent phenomenon in recent years, especially during the crisis in Venezuela. The United Nations, Organization of American States, Amnesty International, Human Rights Watch and Foro Penal have documented acts of torture and violence towards real or perceived opponents of the Bolivarian government, mainly detainees, including by state institutions such as the Bolivarian National Intelligence Service (SEBIN).

Colonial era 
Under rule of the Royal Audiencia of Caracas and the Spanish Inquisition, inhabitants of Venezuela faced serious repression. The Catholic Church served as an important source to royalists, with priests serving as informants who would provide accusations to Inquisition judges because they believed crimes against the Spanish king were crimes against God. Judges then held the power to torture those accused of crimes during interrogations in order to obtain a confession. However, this practice was rare in Spanish-ruled Venezuela since it had already become controversial, even in Europe.

When the Royal Audiencia was deposed and the Supreme Junta was established, the Venezuelan Declaration of Independence explicitly stated that the death penalty was abolished, torture was forbidden and that courts would presume innocence. However, as Venezuela began to face conflicts shortly after its independence, repressive behaviors within the government returned.

Juan Vicente Gómez dictatorship 

In 1854, a house of correction called "" was built to rehabilitate common criminals. Under President Juan Pablo Rojas Paúl, La Rotunda was converted into a prison. La Rotunda grew in prominence under the governments of Cipriano Castro and Juan Vicente Gómez between 1900 and 1935, who heavily utilized the prison for political persecution. Types of punishment and torture included being placed in stocks, strappado, ball and chain, having a rope tightened around your temple and having poison or ground glass placed into food. It was not uncommon that prisoners were tortured or starved to death.

Marcos Pérez Jiménez dictatorship 
Under the dictator Marcos Pérez Jiménez, Venezuelan authorities held little regard for the human rights of citizens. Police often raided homes without search warrants and individuals were imprisoned without evidence. While initially detained, individuals faced torture in instances of interrogation. Political police targeted, arrested, tortured and killed his opponents. Those who were attacked include future Venezuelan president Rómulo Betancourt, Jaime Lusinchi and Luis Herrera Campins. Lusinchi was jailed for two months in 1952 and was beaten with a sword.

Democratic era 
According to Human Rights Watch, the Carlos Andrés Pérez administration also tortured and executed opponents  with a judicial branch that largely ignored abuses by his government. The  and DISIP were used as tools to persecute dissenters. Following the 1992 Venezuelan coup d'état attempts, a crackdown on alleged plotters resulted in accusations of torture by those arrested.

Bolivarian Revolution 

Under the Bolivarian governments, levels of torture occurred that had not been seen since the dictatorship of Marcos Pérez Jiménez.  Following the election of Hugo Chávez, human rights in Venezuela deteriorated. According to Universidad Metropolitana in 2006, "the inquisitorial process" that was abolished in the Venezuelan Declaration of Independence returned to Venezuela. By 2009, the Inter-American Commission on Human Rights released a report stating that Venezuela's government practiced "repression and intolerance".

During the presidency of Nicolás Maduro, torture in Venezuela increased. In La Tumba (The Tomb), one of the headquarters and prisons of SEBIN, has been used for white torture and some of its prisoners have attempted suicide. Conditions in La Tumba have resulted with prisoner illnesses, though Venezuelan authorities refuse to medically treat those imprisoned. Bright lights are continuously left on and prison cells are set at near-freezing temperatures.

In December 2014, the United States signed Venezuela Defense of Human Rights and Civil Society Act of 2014 to impose targeted sanctions on Venezuelan individuals responsible for human rights violations as a result of the 2014 Venezuelan protests. The law allows the freezing of assets and visa bans for those accused of using acts of violence or violating the human rights of those opposing the Venezuelan government. In March 2015, the United States froze assets and revoked visas of several senior officials connected to human rights abuses in Venezuela; these sanctions were condemned in Latin America.

In November 2014, Venezuela appeared before the United Nations Committee Against Torture over cases between 2002 and 2014, which criticized the Venezuelan National Commission for the Prevention of Torture for being biased in favor towards the Bolivarian government. The Committee had also expressed concern with "beatings, burnings and electric shocks in efforts to obtain confessions" that occurred during the 2014 Venezuelan protests and that of the 185 investigations for abuses during the protests, only 5 individuals had been charged. United Nations Special Rapporteur on Torture Juan E. Méndez stated on 11 March 2015 that Venezuela had ignored requests for information and that he had made "conclusions based on the lack of response" and "concluded that the government violated the rights of prisoners", further saying that the Maduro government failed "with the obligation to investigate, prosecute and punish all acts of torture and cruel, inhuman or degrading treatment".

During the 2017 Venezuelan protests, more than 290 cases of torture and thousands of extrajudicial executions were documented by the Organization of American States.

Foreign involvement 
The Organization of American States, with information provided by Casla, reported that some of the 46,000 members of the Cuban Revolutionary Armed Forces assisting the government of Nicolás Maduro were involved with torturing Venezuelans who opposed Maduro. Prisoners reported that they recognized Cuban accents among those who were torturing them.

References